Fimbriaria may refer to:
 Fimbriaria (flatworm), a genus of flatworms in the family Hymenolepididae
 Fimbriaria, a genus of red algae in the family Rhodomelaceae, synonym of Odonthalia
 Fimbriaria, a genus of flowering plants in the family Malpighiaceae, synonym of Janusia